Susan Lynch (born 5 June 1971) is a Northern Irish actress. A three-time IFTA Award winner, she also won the British Independent Film Award for Best Supporting Actress for the 2003 film 16 Years of Alcohol. Her other film appearances include Waking Ned (1998), Nora (2000), Beautiful Creatures (2000), and From Hell (2001). In 2020, she was listed as number 42 on The Irish Times list of Ireland's greatest film actors.

Early life
Lynch was born in Corrinshego, County Armagh, Northern Ireland to an Italian mother (from Trivento) and an Irish father. She has four siblings; her oldest brother is actor John Lynch.

Career
She trained at the Central School of Speech and Drama, and in August 2004, she starred in The Night Season at the Royal National Theatre in London. In 2008, she was one of the leads in The Last Days of Judas Iscariot at the Almeida Theatre.

Her film roles include Beautiful Creatures (2000), Waking Ned Devine (1998), and the title role in Nora (2000), about Nora Barnacle, James Joyce's wife.

Personal life
Lynch and her husband, actor Craig Parkinson, lived in Painswick, Gloucestershire. They have one son together and previously had lived in the Camden area of London. The couple separated in 2019.

Awards
Lynch has won three Irish Film and Television Academy Awards, including Best Leading Actress for her work in the film  County Armagh, Northern Ireland2000 Nora, about Nora Barnacle and her husband, Irish author James Joyce.

Filmography

Film

Television

References

External links

1971 births
Alumni of the Royal Central School of Speech and Drama
Living people
Film actresses from Northern Ireland
Television actresses from Northern Ireland
People from Newry
People from Northern Ireland of Italian descent
20th-century Irish actresses
21st-century Irish actresses